The Beloit Poetry Journal is an American poetry magazine established in 1950 at Beloit College. It was formerly issued four times a year. Its frequency was switched to three times per year. It is based in Windham, Maine.

The stated mission of the magazine is "to seek out and share work of fresh and lasting power, poems that speak startling, complicated, necessary truths and that do so in surprising and beautiful ways," and work "that pushes boundaries of content, aesthetic, and form." As a consequence of these policies they are known for sometimes publishing very long poems.	 

Included among the poets whose work has been featured in Beloit are Sherman Alexie, Bruce Bond, Charles Bukowski, Maxine Cassin, Eduardo C. Corral, Patricia Goedicke, Albert Goldbarth, Ramon Guthrie, Janice N. Harrington, Lola Haskins, Janet Holmes, Fady Joudah, Douglas Kearney, Galway Kinnell, Maxine Kumin, Mary Leader, Khaled Mattawa, and Sharon Olds.

Awards
Starting in 1993 and continuing up to 2017 the Beloit Poetry Journal annually awarded The Chad Walsh Poetry Prize. Recipients have been:

1993  Kurt Leland
1994  Albert Goldbarth
1995  Sherman Alexie
1996  Robert Chute
1997  Mary Leader
1998  Lucia Perillo
1999  Janet Holmes
2000  Margaret Aho
2001  Glori Simmons
2002  Patricia Goedicke
2003  Mary Molinary
2004  Jessica Goodfellow
2005  Karl Elder
2006  Sam Reed
2007  Susan Tichy
2008  John Hodgen
2009  Onna Solomon
2010  Charles Wyatt
2011  Jenny Johnson
2012   Elizabeth T. Gray
2013  Ocean Vuong
2014  Fiona Chamness
2015  Graham Barnhart
2016  Marjorie Stelmach
2017  Michael Lavers

In 2019 the Beloit Poetry Journal established the Adrienne Rich Award for Poetry which would award a fifteen hundred dollar prize for a single poem.

References

External links
 official web page

Magazines established in 1950
Magazines published in Maine
Poetry magazines published in the United States
Quarterly magazines published in the United States
Triannual magazines published in the United States